Joshua Packwood, at the age of 22, became the first white valedictorian of Morehouse College, a historically black college, in 2008.

Packwood was a Rhodes Scholar finalist and graduated with a bachelor's degree in economics with a perfect 4.0 grade point average. Packwood turned down a full scholarship from Columbia University in order to attend Morehouse.

Bibliography 

Alison Go, "White Valedictorian Makes Morehouse History", U.S. News & World Report, 12 May 2008. Available online. Archived by WebCite.
Errin Haines, "2008 valedictorian is different kind of 'Morehouse Man'", 11 May 2009, Associated Press. Available online. Archived by WebCite.
Dana Rosenblatt and Don Lemon, "White valedictorian: A first for historically black Morehouse", 16 May 2008. Available online. Archived by WebCite.
National Public Radio, "Valedictorian Makes History", 14 May 2008. Audio available online.
Dana Rosenblatt and Don Lemon, "White valedictorian: A first for historically black Morehouse"

References 

Living people
Morehouse College alumni
People from Kansas City, Missouri
People from New York City
Year of birth missing (living people)